Hypsibema is a little-known genus of dinosaur from the Late Cretaceous (Campanian stage, around 75 million years ago). Its giant fossils were found in the U.S. states of North Carolina and possibly Missouri. It is believed to be a hadrosauroid, although the Missouri remains were first thought to belong to a small sauropod ("Neosaurus", renamed Parrosaurus).

The type species, Hypsibema crassicauda, was described by Edward Drinker Cope, and was found in Sampson County, North Carolina in 1869. The generic name is derived from Greek υψι/hypsi, "high", and βεμα/bema, "step", as Cope believed that the species walked particularly erect on its toes. The specific name means "with a fat tail" in Latin. The syntypic series, USNM 7189, originally consisted of a caudal vertebra, a metatarsal, and two femoral fragments that were originally identified as humeral and tibial fragments, all found in 1869 by North Carolina state geologist professor Washington Carruthers Kerr in the Black Creek Group of North Carolina. A second vertebra referred to the species, USNM 6136, was later discovered by Edward Wilber Berry and referred to H. crassicauda in 1942. In their 1979 review of dinosaur remains from the Black Creek Group, Baird and Horner (1979) noted that the femoral fragments come from a tyrannosauroid similar to Dryptosaurus, and made the caudal vertebra included in the syntype series of H. crassicauda the lectotype, while stating that the metatarsal could not belong to the same individual as the caudal.

The genus Parrosaurus was considered a species of Hypsibema, H. missouriensis by Donald Baird and Jack Horner in 1979, and since 2004 the official state dinosaur of Missouri. It was considered dubious in both editions of the Dinosauria, although Chase Brownstein considers Parrosaurus valid and distinct from Hypsibema based on new discoveries at the holotype site.

See also

 Timeline of hadrosaur research

References

Hadrosaurs
Late Cretaceous dinosaurs of North America
Taxa named by Edward Drinker Cope
Fossils of North Carolina
Campanian genus first appearances
Campanian genus extinctions
Paleontology in Missouri